Absolum is the stage name of French psytrance artist Christophe Drouillet. In 1994–1997 he was part of the Transwave project together with Frederic Holyszewski, whose stage name is Deedrah. In 1998 he founded psytrance label 3D Vision Records together with DJ Maël, Javier Galloy and Talamasca.

Discography

Albums
2001 Wild (TIP World)
2004 Inside The Sphere (3D Vision)

Singles
1998 Indigo / Metalizer (3D Vision)
2000 Regenerate (TIP World)
2000 The Game (3D Vision)
2001 On The C-Side / Drumatrix Remix (TIP World)

See also

Psychedelic trance
Goa trance music

References

1968 births
French psychedelic trance musicians
Goa trance musicians
Living people